The 2022–23 season is the 121st season in the existence of Exeter City Football Club and the club's first season in the League One since the 2011–12 season following their promotion in the previous season. In addition to the league, they also competed in the 2022–23 EFL Cup, being eliminated in the second round by Gillingham, and the 2022–23 EFL Trophy, failing to qualify from the group stage. The team is also competing in the 2022–23 FA Cup, being eliminated in the second round by Oxford United.

Transfers

In

Out

Loans in

Loans out

Pre-season and friendlies
Southern League side Tiverton Town announced a pre-season friendly with Exeter City on 11 May 2022. Two days later, the club revealed a friendly away to Taunton Town; also of the Southern League. A behind closed doors friendly at the club's training ground against Truro City was also confirmed. On 24 May, the club confirmed a friendly fixture against Yeovil Town. A day later, Torquay United away was added to the schedule. A sixth friendly against Weston-super-Mare was also confirmed. A seventh pre-season fixture, against Bristol City was also added to the schedule.

Competitions

Overall record

League One

League table

Results summary

Results by round

Matches

On 23 June, the league fixtures were announced.

FA Cup

Exeter were drawn away to Port Vale in the first round and to the winners off Woking versus Oxford United in the second round.

EFL Cup

The Grecians were drawn away to Cheltenham Town in the first round, who they went on to beat 7–0 in a multi-club-record-breaking victory. Exeter City were then drawn away at League Two side Gillingham in the second round.

EFL Trophy

On 20 June, the initial Group stage draw was made, grouping Exeter City with Forest Green Rovers and Newport County. Three days later, Southampton U21s joined Southern Group F.

References

Exeter City
Exeter City F.C. seasons
English football clubs 2022–23 season